Palaia Fokaia is a former community and a seaside town in East Attica, Greece. Since the 2011 local government reform it is part of the municipality Saronikos, of which it is a municipal unit. The municipal unit has an area of 22.944 km2. Its population was 3,436 at the 2011 census.  

Currently, Palaia Fokaia includes the settlements of: Thymari - Agia Fotini, Katafygi and the settlement of the Agricultural Bank of Greece.

Geography

Palaia Fokaia is located on the Saronic Gulf coast, in the southeastern part of the Attica peninsula. There are low mountains south and east of the town. It lies 2 km south of Anavyssos, 9 km west of Lavrio and 36 km southeast of Athens city centre. Greek National Road 91 (Athens - Sounio) passes through the town.

The municipal unit includes the village of Thymari (pop. 723) and the small, rocky and deforested island of Patroklos, which is uninhabited.

Historical population

See also
List of municipalities of Attica

References

External links
Official website 
Archaeological Atlas of the Aegean, in Greek

Populated places in East Attica